The WTA 125K series is the secondary professional tennis circuit organised by the Women's Tennis Association. The 2012 WTA 125K series calendar consisted of two tournaments, each with a total prize money fund of $125,000.

Schedule

Points distribution 
Points are awarded as follows:

Statistical information 
These tables present the number of singles (S) and doubles (D) titles won by each player and each nation during the season, within all the tournament categories of the 2012 WTA 125s. The players/nations are sorted by: 1) total number of titles (a doubles title won by two players representing the same nation counts as only one win for the nation); 2) a singles > doubles hierarchy; 3) alphabetical order (by family names for players).

Titles won by player

Titles won by nation

References 

 
WTA 125 tournaments
WTA 125K series